"Big Gun" is a song by Australian rock band AC/DC. It was released as a single in May 1993 from the soundtrack to the Arnold Schwarzenegger movie Last Action Hero, as well as during reruns of The Savage Nation talk show as bumper music. It was later released on the 2009 box set Backtracks. It became the band's first  1 on the US Billboard Album Rock Tracks chart in 1993. At the APRA Music Awards of 1995, the song won Most Performed Australian Work Overseas. AC/DC has played the song live only once during 1996 rehearsals but never at an official show.

As well as its worldwide release on the Last Action Hero soundtrack, the song could be found on iTunes with the rest of the soundtrack, making it for a time the only song by AC/DC on iTunes. However, it was later removed from iTunes along with "Two Steps Behind" by Def Leppard. The song subsequently returned to iTunes along with AC/DC's entire catalogue, although it still is not available to purchase as a track on the Last Action Hero soundtrack; instead it can be purchased as a song from AC/DC's 2009 rarities boxset, Backtracks.

Critical reception
Larry Flick from Billboard complimented "Big Gun" as a "fresh recording", remarking that here, producer Rick Rubin "gives the band's sound a dense, radio-friendly tone without sacrificing its guitar attack or Brian Johnson well-weathered howl. Album-rockers, be alert." Andy Martin from Music Week gave the song four out of five, naming it Pick of the Week in the category of Rock. He stated that "this cannot fail to be a winner" and "a hit is assured." Sam Wood from Philadelphia Inquirer felt that with "Big Gun", "testosterone terrors AC/DC [have] come up with the strongest single since the group's "For Those About to Rock (We Salute You)" - which should come as little surprise, because it's a virtual rewrite of the band's 1981 hit."

Music video
The accompanying music video for "Big Gun" was directed by David Mallet and was released on 24 May 1993, the same day the single was serviced to US album rock radio. It begins with Schwarzenegger (as his film-within-a-film character, Jack Slater) breaking an entrance door to an AC/DC concert. As he walks around the crowd and the stage, observing each band member, Angus kicks his cap towards him. When Schwarzenegger puts on the cap, his clothes morph into Angus' trademark school uniform costume and signature Gibson SG. He then starts imitating Angus' on-stage antics throughout the video, including a scene in which Angus Young actually climbs up on Schwarzenegger's back and rides around the stage perched on his shoulders while continuing to play his guitar chords. The video also features a young Shavo Odadjian, the future bassist for the Armenian-American alternative metal band System of a Down.

The video was similar to the one for "You Could Be Mine" (released to promote Terminator 2: Judgment Day), where Schwarzenegger (as the T-800) interacted with Guns N' Roses.

The video was released on Family Jewels Disc 3, part of the 2009 box set Backtracks. It was not released on the original Family Jewels, because it contains scenes from the movie and therefore had licensing issues.

Track listing
 CD maxi-single (US)
 "Big Gun" (Angus Young, Malcolm Young) – 4:25
 "For Those About to Rock (We Salute You)" (Live in Moscow) (Brian Johnson, Young, Young) – 6:42
 "Back in Black" (Live in Moscow) (Johnson, Young, Young) – 4:26

 CD maxi-single (UK)
 "Big Gun" (Young, Young) – 4:25
 "For Those About to Rock (We Salute You)" (Live in Moscow) (Johnson, Young, Young) – 6:42
 "Shoot to Thrill" (Live at Donington) (Johnson, Young, Young) – 5:45

Personnel
 Brian Johnson – lead vocals
 Angus Young – lead guitar
 Malcolm Young – rhythm guitar, backing vocals
 Cliff Williams – bass guitar, backing vocals
 Chris Slade – drums

This was the last song to feature drummer Chris Slade, before he left AC/DC a year later so that Phil Rudd could return to the band.

Charts

Weekly charts

Year-end charts

Release history

References

External links
 Lyrics

AC/DC songs
1993 singles
1993 songs
APRA Award winners
Atco Records singles
Heavy metal songs
Music videos directed by David Mallet (director)
Song recordings produced by Rick Rubin
Songs written by Angus Young
Songs written by Malcolm Young